Puntarenas Fútbol Club S.A.D. is a Costa Rican football club, currently competing in the Primera División de Costa Rica.

The team plays its home games in the Estadio Municipal de Puntarenas Miguel Ángel "Lito" Pérez Treacy nicknamed "La Olla Mágica" ("The Magic Cauldron") in Puntarenas Centro, Puntarenas Province, Costa Rica, known by that name because of the high temperatures of the zone and the unstopping support from the fans along the games.

History

A.D. Municipal Puntarenas
The club was founded in June 2004, by Adrián Castro Velásquez and Eduardo Li Sánchez and is basically a spinoff of the A.D. Municipal Puntarenas club, founded on January 9, 1952 which until 2001 had spent 34 seasons in the Primera División (UNAFUT). Municipal Puntarenas debuted in the Primera División on 19 April 1964 and won their first and only division title in the 1986–87 season against Alajuelense, they also finished second three more times. In 2002 Municipal Puntarenas was relegated to Liga de Ascenso, Segunda División (LIASCE) and in 2009 to third division Primera División de Liga Nacional de Futbol Aficionado (LINAFA).

A.D. Sánta Barbara franchise purchased
Municipal Puntarenas's relegation in 2001 and Municipal Osa's descent in 2003 left Puntarenas Province without a Primera División club so Li and Castro purchased the franchise of A.D. Santa Bárbara to restore the province's presence in the top tier.

Santa Bárbara had made their debut in the Primera in the 1997–98 season with 4th place being their best league result.

Puntarenas F.C.
Puntarenas F.C. counts with the supporter group "Estação La Samba Primeira" that brings cheers and music to the local games. Puntarenas F.C. played its first game on August 22, 2004, in Estadio Miguel "Lito" Pérez, beating Belén 2–1. They became one of the best teams in the Primera División, being in the first 3 places in their first 3 years as a new team, starting a rivalry with Saprissa and Alajuelense, the most successful teams in the country. According to IFFHS Club World Ranking, Puntarenas F.C. ranked 342 (285) in the World in 2007, making them one of the best squads in Costa Rica and in the UNCAF region.

On July 4, 2007, Eduardo Li Sánchez resigned as team owner and President to take over the reins of Federación Costarricense de Fútbol (FEDEFUTBOL) as president. Owner and Vice President Adrián Castro Velásquez became the club's new president and sole proprietor.

On December 9, 2008, it was announced that Alejandro Márquez, owner of Mexican second division football club Atlético Celaya had bought 50 percent of the shares of Puntarenas F.C. making it the second Costa Rican team with Mexican interest. Márquez was elected vice president.

On February 16, 2009, Adrián Castro Velásquez was assassinated as he left his house in Miramar de Montes de Oro en route to Puntarenas Centro, by a pair of hitman on a motorbike to settle a business dispute. As a result of Castro's tragic death, his wife María Alejandra Ordóñez Lucovich took over his half of the club's shares. The board of directors elected Adrian's son Marcelo Enrique Castro as second Vice President and Víctor Herrera as president.

On June 27, 2009, it was reported that Alejandro Márquez defaulted on his contract with the club. Alejandra Ordóñez took full ownership, control of all club assets and the Presidency.

In 2009, Score One Soccer became equity partner of Puntarenas F.C. and was also granted a 10-year contract by Municipalidad de Puntarenas to operate Estadio Miguel "Lito" Pérez.

In April 2014, Puntarenas were relegated to the Second Division.

In May 2022, Puntarenas beat Carmelita 3-0 on aggregate to win the second division and ascend to Costa Rica’s top flight for the first time since 2014.

Honours
UNCAF Interclub Cup: 1
Winner: 2006

Stadium
The stadium belongs to the municipality of Puntarenas and is used by the teams of the Liga Gatorade de Ascenso, Puntarenas Fútbol Club and Marineros de Puntarenas, in addition to the Third Division team, the Puntarenas San Luis Fútbol Club.

The stadium is being upgraded with lighting.  The Municipality of Puntarenas plans to have the best lighting in all of Central America.
According to the Ministry of Health, the recommended capacity is 4,105 spectators:

North or Shadow Grandstand: 1680 people

South Grandstand: 825 people

East Grandstand: 800 people

West Grandstand: 800 people

It has natural grass but the company Score One Soccer, which has shares of the Puntarenas Fútbol Club and will manage the stadium for 10 years, will remodel it. The dressing rooms and press areas of the stadium have already been remodeled.
It is located 200 m.  west of the Courts of Justice, on Avenida Centenario.  Downtown Puntarenas.

Current squad
As of February 8, 2023

A.D.M. Puntarenas
Players from Asociación Deportiva Municipal Puntarenas who won championship (1986-1987).

References

External links
 Website of Puntarenas FC
 Foro Chuchequeros
 Municipalidad de Puntarenas
 International Federation of Football History & Statistics (IFFHS)

 
Football clubs in Costa Rica
Puntarenas
Association football clubs established in 2004
2004 establishments in Costa Rica
UNCAF Interclub Cup winning clubs